Bit.Trip Complete is a compilation of six games in the Bit.Trip series, including Bit.Trip Beat, Bit.Trip Core, Bit.Trip Void, Bit.Trip Runner, Bit.Trip Fate, and Bit.Trip Flux.

Development
It was developed by Gaijin Games for the Wii and published by Aksys in North America and Rising Star Games in Europe and Australia.

Contents
Included with the game is a music CD, titled Bit.Trip Soundtrack Sampler that contains pieces from all six games.

The game also includes 20 extra "challenge levels" for each game, as well as bonus content related to the production of the games. These levels are completely new but are shorter than the already included levels.

Reception

The game received "favorable" reviews according to the review aggregation website Metacritic.

References

External links
 

2011 video games
Music video games
Wii games
Wii-only games
Video game compilations
Choice Provisions games
Video games developed in the United States
Multiplayer and single-player video games
Action video games
Rising Star Games games